The Sundays River Formation is a geological formation found in the Eastern and Western Cape provinces in South Africa. It is the second youngest of the four formations found within the Uitenhage Group of the Algoa Basin, its type locality, and the only location where outcrops have been located.

Geology 
The Sundays River Formation overlies the Kirkwood Formation which it grades laterally into in certain areas, meaning that they correlate in age in some localities. The sedimentary rock of the Sundays River comprises mainly fine to medium grained grey sandstones which often contain shell fragments, siltstones, and mudstones. The sandstone layers are frequently cemented with calcite layers. These were deposited in a shallow marine environment which likely included estuarine and lagoonal settings.

Paleontology 
The Sundays River is highly fossiliferous and a variety of fossil flora and fauna have been discovered. Invertebrate shells from ammonites, bivalves, and microfossils such as species of forams and ostracods are commonly found cemented within the calcite layers in the sandstone deposits. Trace fossils of gastropod tracks which are infilled with siltstone are also frequently found. Some vertebrate fossils have been found, most notably a near-complete skeleton of a marine plesiosaur, Leptocleidus capensis. However, very little study has been done on the plesiosaur specimen discovered here. Plant remains and non-diagnostic vertebrate fossils have also been recovered.

References 

Geologic formations of South Africa
Cretaceous South Africa
Upper Cretaceous Series of Africa
Hauterivian Stage
Valanginian Stage
Sandstone formations
Shale formations
Siltstone formations
Mudstone formations
Shallow marine deposits
Paleontology in South Africa
Geography of the Eastern Cape
Geography of the Western Cape